Italy competed at the 1968 Summer Olympics in Mexico City, Mexico. 167 competitors, 152 men and 15 women, took part in 103 events in 17 sports.

Medalists

Gold
 Pierfranco Vianelli — Cycling, Men's Individual Road Race 
 Klaus Dibiasi — Diving, Men's Platform
 Primo Baran and Renzo Sambo (Bruno Cipolla coxswain)  — Rowing, Men's Coxed Pairs

Silver
 Giordano Turrini — Cycling, Men's 1000m Sprint (Scratch) 
 Klaus Dibiasi — Diving, Men's Springboard 
 Wladimiro Calarese, Pier-Luigi Chicca, Michele Maffei, Rolando Rigoli, and Cesare Salvadori — Fencing, Men's Sabre Team 
 Romano Garagnani — Shooting, Men's Skeet Shooting

Bronze
 Eddy Ottoz — Athletics, Men's 110m Hurdles 
 Giuseppe Gentile — Athletics, Men's triple jump 
 Giorgio Bambini — Boxing, Men's Heavyweight
 Lorenzo Bosisio, Cipriano Chemello, Giorgio Morbiato, and Luigi Roncaglia — Cycling, Men's 4000m Team Pursuit 
 Giovanni Bramucci, Vittorio Marcelli, Mauro Simonetti, and Pierfranco Vianelli — Cycling, Men's Team Road Race 
 Gianluigi Saccaro — Fencing, Men's Épée
 Abramo Albini, Tullio Baraglia, Renato Bosatta, and Pier Angelo Conti — Rowing, Men's Coxless Fours 
 Fabio Albarelli — Sailing, Men's Finn
 Franco Cavallo and Camillo Gargano — Sailing, Men's Star

Athletics

Basketball

Men's Team Competition
Preliminary Round (Group A)
Defeated Philippines (91-66)
Defeated Panama (94-87)
Defeated Puerto Rico (68-65)
Defeated Senegal (81-55)
Lost to Yugoslavia (69-80)
Lost to United States (61-100)
Defeated Spain (98-86)
Classification Matches
5th/8th place: Lost to Poland (52-66)
7th/8th place: Lost to Spain (72-88)

Team Roster
Carlo Recalcati
Giusto Pellanera
Gianfranco Lombardi
Enrico Bovone
Massimo Masini
Paolo Vittori
Gabriele Vianello
Guido Gatti
Ottorino Flaborea
Sauro Bufalini
Massimo Cosmelli
Gianluigi Jessi

Boxing

Canoeing

Cycling

Sixteen cyclists represented Italy in 1968.

Individual road race
 Pierfranco Vianelli
 Giovanni Bramucci
 Flavio Martini
 Tino Conti

Team time trial
 Giovanni Bramucci
 Vittorio Marcelli
 Mauro Simonetti
 Pierfranco Vianelli

Sprint
 Giordano Turrini
 Dino Verzini

1000m time trial
 Gianni Sartori

Tandem
 Walter Gorini
 Luigi Borghetti

Individual pursuit
 Cipriano Chemello

Team pursuit
 Lorenzo Bosisio
 Cipriano Chemello
 Luigi Roncaglia
 Giorgio Morbiato
 Gino Pancino

Diving

Equestrian

Fencing

19 fencers, 14 men and 5 women, represented Italy in 1968.

Men's foil
 Arcangelo Pinelli
 Pasquale La Ragione
 Nicola Granieri

Men's team foil
 Pasquale La Ragione, Alfredo Del Francia, Nicola Granieri, Arcangelo Pinelli, Michele Maffei

Men's épée
 Gianluigi Saccaro
 Gianfranco Paolucci
 Claudio Francesconi

Men's team épée
 Gianfranco Paolucci, Claudio Francesconi, Giovanni Battista Breda, Gianluigi Saccaro, Antonio Albanese

Men's sabre
 Rolando Rigoli
 Wladimiro Calarese
 Cesare Salvadori

Men's team sabre
 Wladimiro Calarese, Rolando Rigoli, Pierluigi Chicca, Michele Maffei, Cesare Salvadori

Women's foil
 Giovanna Masciotta
 Antonella Ragno-Lonzi
 Bruna Colombetti-Peroncini

Women's team foil
 Antonella Ragno-Lonzi, Giulia Lorenzoni, Giovanna Masciotta, Bruna Colombetti-Peroncini, Silvana Sconciafurno

Gymnastics

Modern pentathlon

Three male pentathletes represented Italy in 1968.

Individual
 Mario Medda
 Giancarlo Morresi
 Nicolo Deligia

Team
 Mario Medda
 Giancarlo Morresi
 Nicolo Deligia

Rowing

Sailing

Shooting

Seven shooters, all men, represented Italy in 1968.

25 m pistol
 Giovanni Liverzani
 Ugo Amicosante

50 m rifle, three positions
 Giuseppe De Chirico

50 m rifle, prone
 Giuseppe De Chirico

Trap
 Galliano Rossini
 Ennio Mattarelli

Skeet
 Romano Garagnani
 Giancarlo Chiono

Swimming

Men's Competition
 Pietro Boscaini, Michele D'Oppido, Franco Del Campo, Franco Chino, Antonio Attanasio, Angelo Tozzi, Giampiero Fossati, and Massimo Sacchi.

Women's Competition
 Mietta Strumolo and Novella Calligaris

Water polo

Men's Team Competition
Team Roster
Alberto Alberani
Eraldo Pizzo
Mario Cevasco
Gianni Lonzi
Enzo Barlocco
Franco Lavoratori
Gianni de Magistris
Alessandro Ghibellini
Giancarlo Guerrini
Paolo Ferrando
Eugenio Merello

Weightlifting

Wrestling

References

External links
 

Nations at the 1968 Summer Olympics
1968
1968 in Italian sport